Effy may refer to:
 Effy Stonem, a fictional character in the television series Skins
 Effy (Skins series 1), an episode of Skins
 Effy (wrestler), American professional wrestler
 Effy Irvine, the first woman in Scotland to run a parish